The Glascock County School District is a public school district in Glascock County, Georgia, United States, based in Gibson. It serves the communities of Edge Hill, Gibson, and Mitchell.

Schools
The Glascock County School District has one consolidated school including pre-school to grade twelve.

Elementary-middle-high school
Glascock County Consolidated School

References

External links

School districts in Georgia (U.S. state)
Education in Glascock County, Georgia